"Big" Jack Zelig (May 13, 1888 – October 5, 1912) was an American gangster and one of the last leaders of the Eastman Gang.

Biography
Born Selig Harry Lefkowitz in the Lower East Side of Manhattan in New York City, New York, Zelig was a well-known pickpocket and thief by age 6. He was a member of Crazy Butch's pickpocket gang before joining the Eastman Gang in the late 1890s.

Rising up the ranks, Zelig sought control over the fragmented Eastman Gang in 1908, after "Kid Twist" (Max Zwerbach) was murdered by a rival. Zelig's crew had more than 75 members, including satellite gangs such as the Lenox Avenue Gang in Harlem, led by "Gyp the Blood" (aka Harry Horowitz). During this period, when ethnic Jewish gangsters became predominant in the gang, Zelig was also known as "The Big Yid".

Feud with Sirocco and Tricker
After Zelig was arrested in 1911 for robbing a brothel, Sirocco and Tricker attempted to gain leadership of the gang by refusing to bail out their boss. Zelig was later released due to his political connections. One of his men told him that Sirocco and Tricker were planning on murdering him.  The assassin, a gunman named Julie Morrell, was lured by Zelig to The Stuyvesant Casino  where he was killed by the gang leader on December 2, 1911. (That building at 140 Second Avenue is now used as the Ukrainian National Home.)

The next year, the longstanding Eastman/Five Points feud flared anew. As Zelig left the Criminal Courts building on June 3, 1912, he was shot through the neck by Five Points gunman Charley Torti. He was a known associate of Louis Pioggi, aka Louie the Lump, who had murdered Zelig's mentor, Kid Twist Zwerbach, four years earlier. Zelig had been released on $1000 bail after his arrest for "shooting up the saloon" of Pioggi's brother Jake. Zelig recovered from his wound in time to be dragged into the Becker/Rosenthal case.

Final years

Charles Becker, a corrupt NYPD lieutenant, had Zelig in his pocket for quite some time. In the summer of 1912, Becker was reported by New York World as one of three corrupt police officers involved in the affairs of Herman Rosenthal. This small-time bookmaker had complained to the press that his illegal businesses had been badly damaged by the greed of the city's corrupt police officers.

Becker told Jack Zelig and members of the Lenox Avenue Gang, specifically, Harry "Gyp the Blood" Horowitz, Jacob "Whitey Lewis" Seidenshner, Louis "Lefty Louie" Rosenberg, and Francesco "Dago Frank" Cirofisi, that he wanted Rosenthal "croaked". The gambler was gunned down in front of the Hotel Metropole in Times Square on July 16, 1912, two days after his story appeared in the newspapers. In the aftermath, District Attorney Charles S. Whitman made no secret of his belief that the gangsters who killed him had committed the murder at Becker's behest.

The fall-out from the Rosenthal murder was huge, making national headlines. All of Big Jack's henchmen were rounded up and charged with murder. It was widely whispered that their boss would testify against them in exchange for leniency.

Death
The day before he could do so, on October 5, 1912, Zelig was shot behind the ear and killed by "Boston Red" Phil Davidson (of 111 E. 7th Street) while riding on a 2nd Avenue trolley car while passing East 13th Street. Zelig was hanging out at Segal's Cafe (76 Second Avenue, now a church), when he received an anonymous phone call requesting his presence on 14th street. Zelig jumped on the uptown trolley; when he stood up at the intersection of 13th street, Davidson approached him and killed him with a police revolver. Zelig was 24 years old. Davidson ran East on 14th Street where he ran into a police officer on beat patrol who made him drop his weapon.

Davidson claimed he had shot Zelig over a $400 grudge, but it was popularly believed he had been killed to keep him from testifying against Charles Becker in the Rosenthal murder case involving the Lenox Avenue Gang.

Legacy
Shortly after Zelig's death New York detective Abe Shoenfeld wrote "Jack Zelig is as dead as a door nail. Men before him – like Kid Twist, Monk Eastman, and others – were as pygmies to a giant. With the passing of Zelig, one of the most 'nerviest', strongest, and best men of his kind left us."

References

Further reading
 Keefe, Rose. The Starker: Big Jack Zelig, the Becker-Rosenthal Case, and the Advent of the Jewish Gangster, Cumberland House Publishing, 2008
 Fried, Albert. The Rise and fall of the Jewish Gangster in America, Holt, Rinehart, and Winston, 1980
 Rockaway, Robert A. (2000). But He Was Good to His Mother: The Lives and Crimes of Jewish Gangsters. Gefen Publishing House. 
 Downey, Patrick. Gangster City: The History of the New York Underworld 1900–1935. Barricade Books, 2004. 
Almog, Oz, Kosher Nostra Jüdische Gangster in Amerika, 1890–1980 ; Jüdischen Museum der Stadt Wien ; 2003, Text Oz Almog, Erich Metz,

External links
Jack Zelig website
"But he was Good to his Mother: A story of Jewish Gangsters - Jack Zelig"
 
"Zelig & the Lower Eastside - Gangster City"
"Big Jack Zelig - Lower East Side Gang Leader" by Rose Keefe at J-Grit.com

1888 births
1912 deaths
Murdered Jewish American gangsters
Criminals from New York City
Eastman Gang
Rosenthal murder case
People murdered in New York City
Male murder victims
Deaths by firearm in Manhattan